Titusville Airport may refer to:

 Titusville Airport in Titusville, Pennsylvania, United States (FAA: 6G1)
 Space Coast Regional Airport in Titusville, Florida, United States (FAA/IATA: TIX)
 Arthur Dunn Airpark in Titusville, Florida, United States (FAA: X21)